The Las Vegas Desert Dogs are a box lacrosse team in the National Lacrosse League. The team plays at Michelob Ultra Arena in Paradise, Nevada. The team began play in the 2023 NLL season.

History
On June 21, 2021, the NLL awarded an expansion franchise to the city of Las Vegas and co-owners Joseph Tsai, Wayne Gretzky, Steve Nash and Dustin Johnson. The team began play in the 2022–2023 season beginning in winter 2022 at Michelob Ultra Arena. Tsai is the owner of the San Diego Seals and has received special permission from the NLL to own multiple teams.
Shawn Williams, one of the most accomplished players in NLL history, has been selected to lead the Las Vegas Desert Dogs as the franchise’s first General Manager and Head Coach.

Roster 

Source:

References

External links
 Official Website

2021 establishments in Nevada
 
National Lacrosse League teams

Proposed sports teams